[2.2.2]Cryptand is the organic compound with the formula N(CH2CH2OCH2CH2OCH2CH2)3N. This bicyclic molecule is the most studied member of the cryptand family of chelating agents. It is a white solid.  Many analogous compounds are known.  Their high affinity for alkali metal cations illustrates the advantages of "preorganization", a concept within the area of supramolecular chemistry.  

For the design and synthesis of [2.2.2]cryptand, Jean-Marie Lehn shared the Nobel Prize in Chemistry. The compound was originally prepared starting with the diacylation of the diamine-diether: 
[CH2OCH2CH2NH2]2  +  [CH2OCH2COCl]2  →   [CH2OCH2CH2NHC(O)CH2]2  +  2 HCl
The resulting macrocyclic diamide is reduced by lithium aluminium hydride. The resulting macrocyclic diamine tetraether reacts with a second equivalent of [CH2OCH2COCl]2 to produce the macrobicyclic diamide.  This di(tertiary)amide is reduced to the diamine by diborane.

[2.2.2]Cryptand binds K+ as an octadentate N2O6 ligand.  The resulting cation K([2.2.2]cryptand)+ is lipophilic.

References

Chelating agents